Great Atlantic & Pacific Tea Company may refer to:

The Great Atlantic and Pacific Tea Company, the grocery store chain
A&P Canada, the former Canadian supermarket chain sold by A&P to Quebec-based Metro Inc.

It may also refer to specific buildings:

Great Atlantic & Pacific Tea Company (Atlanta, Georgia), on the National Register of Historic Places listings in Fulton County, Georgia
A & P Food Stores Building, St. Louis, Missouri
Great Atlantic and Pacific Tea Company Warehouse, Jersey City, New Jersey, a National Historic Landmark

See also
A&P (disambiguation)

The Great Atlantic & Pacific Tea Company